East Gores is a hamlet in the Colchester district, in the English county of Essex. It is near the A120 road.

References
http://www.a-zmaps.co.uk/?nid=60&iid=7364&pts=1,2,3,4,5,6,&s=Essex&t=0&st=1

Hamlets in Essex
Borough of Colchester